The Broadway Historic District or Honky Tonk Highway is a historic district located in Nashville, Tennessee. It was listed on the National Register of Historic Places listings in Davidson County, Tennessee (NRHP) in 1980.

History
Between 1870 and 1900 Broadway became a political and commercial center. The district is located between 2nd Avenue and 5th Avenue on Broadway Street in Downtown Nashville. It was added to the National Register of Historic Places listings in Davidson County, Tennessee on July 18, 1980.

The area has become a tourist destination welcoming families in the daytime and adults over 21 years old in the evening. The district is lined with Honky-tonks including Legends and Tootsie's Orchid Lounge. The street is also referred to as "Honky Tonk Highway". The district includes parts of Lower Broadway to 2nd Avenue and it attracts many tourists and residents. It has become one of Nashville's most popular tourist destinations.

References

1880 establishments in Tennessee
National Register of Historic Places in Nashville, Tennessee
Historic districts on the National Register of Historic Places in Tennessee
Geography of Nashville, Tennessee
Tourist attractions in Tennessee
Tourist attractions in Nashville, Tennessee